A Very Good Year is a 1980 Australian play by Bob Ellis. It was set in the last two weeks of the 1970s and Ellis called it his farewell to "the Whitlam decade". The play was heavily autobiographical. A reviewer from the Sydney Morning Herald called it "a flop".

References

External links

1980 plays
Australian plays